Iuri Osip'ovi (born 16 March 1937) is a Soviet Olympic fencer. He competed in the individual and team foil events at the 1956 Summer Olympics.

References

External links
 

1937 births
Living people
Russian male fencers
Soviet male fencers
Olympic fencers of the Soviet Union
Fencers at the 1956 Summer Olympics
Sportspeople from Volgograd